Lithocarpus cantleyanus is a tree in the beech family Fagaceae. It is named for a superintendent of the Singapore Botanic Gardens, Nathaniel Cantley.

Description
The greyish brown bark is scaly or fissured or lenticellate.

Distribution and habitat
Lithocarpus cantleyanus grows naturally in Myanmar, Thailand, Peninsular Malaysia, Singapore and Borneo. Its habitat is hill dipterocarp forests up to  altitude.

References

cantleyanus
Trees of Myanmar
Trees of Thailand
Trees of Malaya
Trees of Borneo
Plants described in 1888